Ditrigona quinaria is a moth in the family Drepanidae. It was described by Frederic Moore in 1867. It is found in China, Tibet and India.

The wingspan is 12–17.5 mm for males and 14–18.5 for females. The forewings and hindwings are speckled with grey. There are five grey transverse fasciae, consisting of a double antemedial fascia with the distal line thickest and a single broad conspicuous postmedial fascia. The narrow terminal fascia are usually present.

Subspecies
Ditrigona quinaria quinaria (Tibet, north-eastern India)
Ditrigona quinaria erminea Wilkinson, 1968 (China: Shensi)
Ditrigona quinaria leucophaea Wilkinson, 1968 (Tibet)
Ditrigona quinaria nivea (Hampson, 1893) (India: Assam)
Ditrigona quinaria spodia Wilkinson, 1968 (China: Yunnan)

References

Moths described in 1867
Drepaninae
Moths of Asia